Carl Duncan may refer to:

 Carl Porter Duncan (1921–1999), professor of experimental psychology
 Carl D. Duncan, botanist and entomologist